James Henry Mays (June 29, 1868 – April 19, 1926) was a U.S. Representative from Utah.

Born in Morristown, Tennessee, Mays attended the district schools.
He moved to Kansas in 1883 with his parents, who settled in Galena, Kansas.
He worked in the mines and as a lumberman.
He attended the Kansas State Normal School.
From 1893 to 1902 engaged in the life insurance business at Chicago, Illinois, Dubuque, Iowa, and Salt Lake City, Utah.
He was graduated from the law department of the University of Michigan at Ann Arbor in 1895.
He was admitted to the bar and commenced practice in Ann Arbor, Michigan.
He moved to Indianapolis, Indiana, in 1896 and to Utah in 1902.
Organized several industrial organizations.

Mays was elected as a Democrat to the Sixty-fourth, Sixty-fifth, and Sixty-sixth Congresses (March 4, 1915 – March 3, 1921).
He was not a candidate for reelection in 1920.
He retired to his stock ranch near Wendell, Idaho, and died there on April 19, 1926.
He was interred in Gooding Cemetery, Gooding, Idaho.

His home near Wendell, built in 1920 and known as the James Henry and Ida Owen Mays House, was listed on the National Register of Historic Places in 1993.

Sources

1868 births
1926 deaths
People from Wendell, Idaho
University of Michigan Law School alumni
Democratic Party members of the United States House of Representatives from Utah
People from Morristown, Tennessee
People from Galena, Kansas
Burials at Elmwood Cemetery (Gooding, Idaho)